Loud Tour Live at the O2 is the second live long-form video by Barbadian singer Rihanna. It was released on December 13, 2012 by SRP and Def Jam Recordings. The DVD and Blu-ray Disc release feature her concert at The O2 Arena in London, England as part of the Loud Tour (2011), in support of her fifth studio album Loud (2010). Directed by Nick Wickham and produced by Ciarra Pardo and Emer Patten, it was filmed during the last three shows in London.

The concert consists of five sets including the encore and feature songs from Loud as well as Rihanna's previous albums including Good Girl Gone Bad (2007) and Rated R (2009). Loud Tour Live at the O2 debuted within the top ten on over ten national music video charts. It was most successful in France and Belgium (Wallonia) where the release peaked at number two. On the US Billboard Music Video Sales chart, the album peaked at number 11.

Background 

In November 2010, Rihanna released her fifth studio album Loud. Recording sessions for the album began in February 2010 and continued for six months, overlapping with her Last Girl on Earth Tour (2010—11) and filming for her debut feature film Battleship (2012). Rihanna and L.A. Reid assembled a group of songwriters and record producers at several recording studios in Los Angeles for two weeks to write songs for Rihanna; they wrote approximately 200 songs, eleven of which were included on the album. Upon its release, Loud received generally positive reviews from most music critics and earned Rihanna a Grammy Award for Best Dance Recording for the lead single "Only Girl (In the World)". It became a huge commercial success and produced seven singles that attained chart success.

To further promote the album, Rihanna embarked on her third worldwide and fourth overall tour entitled Loud Tour (2011). The tour was officially announced on February 9, 2011, when North American dates were revealed. Critics gave the tour a positive response, with Jon Brean of the Star Tribune noting, "The Barbadian singer is more visually and vocally dynamic than she has ever been before." During an interview with Ryan Seacrest after Rihanna performed "California King Bed" on American Idol, April 14, 2011, the singer spoke about the tour's development. Rihanna addressed rumors about a special performance to be included on the setlist in order to fully incorporate her fans into the experience. When asked by Seacrest about the fan experience, she explained, "Right now, we just designed the stage. I'm really not supposed to say this, but I want to get you excited ... We're building two sections on the stage [for the fans. They'll be] closer than they've ever been. It's real VIP."

Release 

Apart from North America, Rihanna also performed two legs in Europe and one in South America. Loud Tour Live at the O2 was filmed at the O2 Arena show in London. During the tour, Rihanna performed 10 shows in London's O2 Arena. Via her official Twitter account, she announced that she was to film the final three outsold shows of the Loud Tour in London (held from December 20–22, 2011) for a live DVD, "Big news Navy! You’ve been begging for it & Rihanna heard you! The last three dates of the LOUD Tour at the O2 in London will be filmed for a concert DVD coming out in 2012 !". On November 19, 2012, Rihanna released her seventh studio album Unapologetic (2012) in both standard and deluxe editions. The deluxe edition of the album contains a special footage from the Loud Tour entitled First Look: Loud Tour Live at the O2 Arena. Rihanna posted the official trailer for the video album on her official YouTube channel, on December 6, 2012. Loud Tour Live at the O2 was released in DVD and Blu-ray formats in Germany on December 14, 2012, and in Portugal and Spain on December 17, 2012 and the following day in Canada, Italy and the United States. The video album was directed by Nick Wickham and produced by Ciarra Pardo and Emer Patten. The editor of the video was Guy Harding.

Concert synopsis 

Loud Tour Live at the O2 begins with Rihanna and her team arriving with a ferryboat on a dock. Rihanna continues to walk through and explains how she's feeling very sad and emotional as a result of the Loud Tour ending. The singer starts crying and explains that she and her team have done very good things this year and she believes those things wouldn't happen without the support of her fans. However, now she has to go back to Los Angeles where she doesn't have any friends; her "very best" friends travel with her around the world. Before getting into the van, Rihanna says that the tour was one of her best experiences of her life and talks about how she will miss her fans the upcoming year. Scenes are intercut with the start of the show at The O2 Arena. After the interlude, Rihanna starts the show with the opening song "Only Girl (In the World)". Emerging from a purple ball, the singer performs the song while wearing a blue electric dress and is surrounded by four backup dancers. As "Disturbia" starts she removes the dress and reveals a colorful daisy duke. For the performance of "Shut Up and Drive" a car is present during the scene, to which Rihanna climbs while performing. The set finishes with a rendition of "Man Down".

Scenes are intercut with Rihanna heading to her show in a metro, together with her audience. As she gets into the arena, scenes are intercut and show the singer and her crew preparing for the start of the show and shouting the name of the cities in which they performed. The scenes are again intercut with Rihanna talking about her love towards Miami, and how she moved first in the city when she got signed to the label. Scenes of her and friends taking shots and having fun are further shown. Then, Rihanna explains how the second section of the Loud Tour is called "Le Sex Shoppe"; the director of the tour Jamie King was inspired for creating the section after he saw online the pictures of the singer visiting a sex shop in Australia. A scene of an early rehearsal for the tour is also shown, before seeing Rihanna performing "S&M" live on the concert. After the song, she performs "Skin"; during the performance, the singer takes two girls from the audience and performs lap dance as the set finishes with Nuno Bettencourt having a guitar solo. The scenes are intercut with Rihanna getting ready for the shoot of her We Found Love music video. Several scenes of Rihanna including getting off the plane, choosing clothes, getting ready for a shoot and greeting her fans are shown. The next parts of the video show her at the studio while recording her sixth studio album Talk That Talk (2011). Scenes are intercut with her doing the photo session for the album. Rihanna is shown at an Armani design meeting in London. She is talking about the commercial which they are preparing to shoot for the design company. Black-and-white scenes of Rihanna getting ready to go on stage again are shown before she starts performing "Raining Men". The performance of the song features her performing the song on top of a pink tank. Then, she gets off the tank and performs "Hard" and "Breakin' Dishes".

After the performances, scenes of Rihanna and her team are shown choosing the artwork for Talk That Talk, as well as Rihanna preparing for her appearance on Ellen DeGeneres Show. She also discusses the breakdown she had during the tour. After the interlude, the singer is back on the stage wearing a yellow dress, performing "Unfaithful" on a platform. Then, she sings "Hate That I Love You" while sitting on a chair and then "California King Bed" as the last song from the set. Scenes of Rihanna having fun with her fans and making a birthday party for her manager Jay Brown is shown. Scenes of the singer in Madrid, one week before Christmas are shown; she takes a tour on the bus with which they are traveling around Europe. Rihanna is then shown getting ready for the show before starting to perform "What's My Name?" in daisy duke accompanied with four female dancers. She performs "Rude Boy" and is accompanied by male dancers wearing colorful outfits. Before performing "Cheers (Drink to That)" she takes a shot of a drink. The set is followed with "Don't Stop the Music" and finishes with Rihanna performing "Take a Bow" together with the audience. Before the encore starts, scenes of Rihanna preparing for the show are shown. She is arguing with the tour director how the set should arrange, because she wants to add "We Found Love" to it. She then rehearses for the choreography of the latter song alongside her dancers and explains how she learned the whole dance for 30 minutes. Her choreographer Tunisha praises and calls her "a dope". Then, the last set starts with a man who wears glasses performing on a piano. Rihanna then emerges and sits on the top of it. At one point in the performance, the piano started levitating and when the songs end the piano is again in the background. The music then transitions to "Umbrella"; the performance features golden drops on the LED screens. Loud Tour Live at the O2 finishes with Rihanna performing "We Found Love" as the final song; the end of the performance features red confetti flying around.

Commercial performance 

Loud Tour Live at the O2 debuted at number 12 on the Flemish Belgian Music DVD Chart for the week dated December 22, 2012. The next weak it climbed six places to number six. On January 19, 2013, the album reached its peak on the chart at number three. On the Wallonian Belgian Music DVD Chart, the album debuted at number three for the week dated December 29, 2012. After three weeks on the chart, it reached its peak of number two on January 19, 2013. The release also peaked at number three on the Swiss Music DVD Chart and number seven on the Dutch Music DVD Chart. For the last week of December 2012, Loud Tour Live at the O2 debuted at number 12 on the Czech Music DVD Chart. The following week it stayed on the same position, while in the second week of January 2013, it peaked at number six. In the last week of January it reached its peak of number five on the chart. The DVD debuted at peaked at number eighton the UK Music Video Chart and number nine on the Irish Music DVDs Chart. The album was more successful in France where debuted and peaked at number two on the French Music DVD Chart. Loud Tour Live at the O2 debuted at number 11 on the US Billboard Music Video Sales chart which was also its peak. Additionally, it peaked at number eight on the Australian Music DVD Chart.

Track listing

Credits and personnel

Credits adapted from the ending notes of Loud Tour Live at the O2, Def Jam Recordings, SRP Records.

Band
Rihanna (lead vocals)
Christopher Johnson (drums)
Charlie Wilson (musical director / keyboards / piano)
Nicole Kehl (background singer)
Nuno Bettencourt (guitars)
Eric Smith (bass)
Shayna Cook (background singer)
Harvey "Lex" Marshall (musical director / keyboards / percussion)

Dancers
Mikey Pesante
Christina Chandler
Christian Owens
Khadija Nicholas
Mikey Martinez
Frankie Gordils
Shauna Mitchell
Michele Martinez

Photography
Mellisa Forde for MTF Photography
Djeneba Aduayom

Tour director
Jamie King

Musical director
Kevin Antunes

Vocal coach
Robert Stevenson

Touring crew
Joe Sanchez – Production manager
Ramey Shippen – Production coordinator
Roger Cabot – Stage manager
Dominic Park – Backstage manager
Ashley Hough – Backstage assistant
Mark Wise – Venue security chief
Larry Echols – Venue security
Dan Roe – Backline crew chief
Kenny Sharretts – Drum & percussion technician
Steve Borisenko – Guitar technician
Beth Schmitz – Wardrobe manager

Lindsey Radzyminski – Wardrobe assistant
Fritz Breitfelder – Head rigger
Darrel Schlabach – Assistant rigger
Juan Guerra – Automation crew chief
Kyle Wolfson – Automation programmer  
Bruce Haynes – Head carpenter
Jim Webb – Carpented & show caller
Jesus "Chuy" Arroyo, Joe "Bobo" Bodner, Tyrone Bramwell, Tom Keane, FOH Audio, 8th Day, Sean "Sully" Sulivan – Carpenters
Edward Ehrbar – Monitor Engineer 
Jim Corbin – Audio crew chief 
Jim Allen, Victor Arko, James La Marca – Audio technicians
Bert Pare – Video director
Mike Helton – Video crew chief
Sean Binns – LED & projections technician
Blake Hopkins, Graham Lambkin, Mike Muscato, Edward Prescott – Video technicians
Background images – Video content
Dominic Smith – Light director
Carl Burnett – Lighting crew chief
Philip de Boissiere, Matt Bright, William Coster, Dominic Fanelli, William Keating – 
Upstage – Lighting vendor
Pyrotek FX, Kenn Macdonald – Pyrotechnics
Eat Your Hearts Out – Cattering
Amanda Kellar – Catering crew chief
Paul Carrington, Graeme Lietch, Peter Mcgeechan, Antonia Stock – Chefs
Renette Cronje, Gema Dally – FOH caterer 
Live Nation, Steve Homer – Local promoter
Andrew Craig – Local promoter representative
Steve Walker – Merchandising

Film crew
Eugene O'Conor – Lighting Director
Johnny McCullagh – Gaffer
Brett Turnbull – Director of Photography
Jamie Carrol, Dave Emery, Dogan Halil, Kelvin Richard, Harriet Sheard, Andy Watt, Alan Wells, Nick Wheeler, Shaun Willis – Camera operators
Evan E. Rogers, James Tonkin – Documentary Camera Operators
Nigel Bating – Documentary Sound Recordist
Johnny Donne, Dave Mcnaulty, Alex Mott, Jem Morton, Alex Tate – Grips
Nep Visions – Technical Facilities
Brain Clark – Operations Manager
Trevor Cooper – Unit Manager
Marc Baker – Floor Manager
Christine Henry – Script Supervisor
Rod Warderl – Vision Mixer

Charts

Certifications

Release history

References 

Rihanna video albums
Live video albums
2012 video albums